Seven Summers is a British rock band from Essex. The band members are Alex Baker (drums), Jon Holland (bass), Matt Cardle (vocals and guitar) and Neillo (guitars).

Career
The band released their self-titled debut album on 22 January 2010 which included the songs "Youngblood", "Way to Be" and "Dirt". This was followed later that year by the single "Picture of You".

Not having a record contract, they distributed their music independently, with the album reaching No. 30 on the Official UK Album Downloads Chart, No. 11 on the Official UK Independent Album Chart, and No. 1 on the Official UK Independent Album Breakers Charts for week ending 25 December 2010.

Following Matt's success on The X Factor in 2010, the band saw an upsurge in popularity, with their music videos gaining large numbers of views on YouTube.

The band performed live on Sue Marchant's BBC radio program on 8 December 2009. They also won the 'Panic Awards Best Band 2010' award.

In July 2018, the band reformed.

Discography

Studio albums

Singles
2010: "Picture of You"

References

External links

Seven Summers on Facebook

English indie rock groups
Musical groups established in 2009
Musical groups from Essex